This is a list of journalists from Italy:

20th century

A–B

Francesco Alberoni
Barbara Alberti
Luigi Albertini
Magdi Allam
Ilaria Alpi
Corrado Alvaro
Giulio Andreotti
Alberto Angela
Piero Angela
Claudio Angelini
Giovanni Battista Angioletti
Lucia Annunziata
Gaetano Arfé
Bruno Arpaia
Giovanni Arpino
Sergio Atzeni
Corrado Augias
Enzo Baldoni
Eugenio Balzan
Paolo Barnard
Antonio Barolini
Ezio Bartalini
Cesare Battisti
Roberto Beccantini
Oliviero Beha
Maurizio Belpietro
Arrigo Benedetti
Stefano Benni
Enrico Benzing
Paolo Bertolucci
Tommaso Besozzi
Enzo Bettiza
Alberto Bevilacqua
Enzo Biagi
Michele Bianchi
Luciano Bianciardi
Fausto Biloslavo
Aldo Biscardi
Giorgio Bocca
Italo Bocchino
Laura Boldrini
Adriano Bolzoni
Franco Bomprezzi
Laudomia Bonanni
Ivanoe Bonomi
Giuseppe Antonio Borgese
Roberto Bortoluzzi
Giovanna Botteri
Gianni Brera
Paolo Brera
Federico Buffa
Dino Buzzati

C–D

Pietro Calabrese
Piero Calamandrei
Novella Calligaris
Achille Campanile
Candido Cannavò
Paolo Carbone
Lianella Carell
Mario Carli
Alberto Castagna
Alberto Cavallari
Giulio Cerreti
Gerardo Chiaromonte
Giulietto Chiesa
Italo Alighiero Chiusano
Fausta Cialente
Antonella Clerici
Gianni Clerici
Tristano Codignola
Daniele Compatangelo
Massimo Consoli
Ermanno Corsi
Maurizio Costanzo
Tiziano Crudeli
Maria Cuffaro
Franco Cuomo
Susanna Cutini
Emanuela Da Ros
Corrado Maria Daclon
Andrea De Adamich
Alceste De Ambris
Augusto De Angelis
Paolo De Chiesa
Augusto De Marsanich
Mauro De Mauro
Valentina De Poli
Giuliano De Risi
Gildo De Stefano
Dario De Toffoli
Enrico Deaglio
Luciano del Castillo
Ivan Della Mea
Renzo de' Vidovich
Tiziano Thomas Dossena

E–G

Luigi Einaudi
Alain Elkann
Paolo Facchinetti
Oriana Fallaci
Salvatore Farina
Roberto Farinacci
Alessandra Farkas
Giovanni Claudio Fava
Giuseppe Fava
Emilio Fede
Antonio Felici
Vittorio Feltri
Giuliano Ferrara
Lando Ferretti
Ennio Flaiano
Paolo Flores d'Arcais
Vittorio Foa
Marco Follini
Francesco Forte
Mario Fortunato
Paolo Fox
Luigi Freddi
Mario Furlan
Milena Gabanelli
Gigi Garanzini
Guido Gatti
Alfonso Gatto
Jas Gawronski
Roberto Giacobbo
Oscar Giannino
Maria Cristina Giongo
Igino Giordani
Luca Giurato
Piero Gobetti
Gianfranco Goria
Antonio Gramsci
Carlo Grande
Gianni Granzotto
Ezio Maria Gray
Gerardo Greco
Ugo Gregoretti
Almerigo Grilz
Mario Gromo
Lilli Gruber
Giovannino Guareschi
Paolo Guzzanti

H–M

Daniela Hamaui
Pietro Ichino
Pietro Ingrao
Telesio Interlandi
Gualtiero Jacopetti
Rula Jebreal
Peter Kolosimo
Alexander Langer
Vincenzo Lavarra
Domenico Leccisi
Gad Lerner
Gianni Letta
Giuseppe Leuzzi
Arrigo Levi
Mimmo Liguoro
Giovanni Lilliu
Massimo Lo Jacono
Antonio Locatelli
Paolo Longo
Giovanni Lurani
Maria Antonietta Macciocchi
Stefano Madia
Lucio Magri
Mattias Mainiero
Maria Majocchi
Curzio Malaparte
Franco Maria Malfatti
Giorgio Manganelli
Raimondo Manzini
Rosanna Marani
Claudio Martelli
Daniele Mastrogiacomo
Ezio Mauro
Viviana Mazza
Giorgia Meloni
David Messina
Vittorio Messori
Paolo Mieli
Franco Mimmi
Gianni Minà
Maurizio Molinari
Antonio Monda
Ernesto Teodoro Moneta
Eugenio Montale
Indro Montanelli
Mario Monticelli
Manlio Morgagni
Oddino Morgari
Maurizio Mosca
Germano Mosconi
Arnaldo Mussolini
Benito Mussolini

N–Q

Gian Gaspare Napolitano
Gianluca Attanasio
Pietro Nenni
Stanislao Nievo
Fiamma Nirenstein
Gabriele Nissim
Umberto Notari
Augusto Novelli
Giuseppe Oddo
Angelo Oliviero Olivetti
Alberto Ongaro
Graziano Origa
Giancarlo Pallavicini
Marcello Palmisano
Marco Pannella
Michele Pantaleone
Sergio Panunzio
Mario Pappagallo
Goffredo Parise
Cristina Parodi
Pier Maria Pasinetti
Stefania Passaro
Sandro Paternostro
Alessandro Pavolini
Riccardo Pazzaglia
Carmine Pecorelli
Carlo Pelanda
Lea Pericoli
Nico Perrone
Sandro Pertini
Arrigo Petacco
Romina Petrozziello
Claudio Petruccioli
Anna Piaggi
Giorgio Pini
Fernanda Pivano
Irene Pivetti
Bruno Pizzul
Beniamino Placido
Roberto Poletti
Massimo Polidoro
Mario Praz
Giuseppe Prezzolini
Pier Antonio Quarantotti Gambini

R–S

Giovanni Raboni
Pino Rauti
Lidia Ravera
Raffaella Reggi
Camillo Ricchiardi
Gianni Riotta
Luisa Rivelli
Gianni Rocca
Andrea Romano
Lalla Romano
Sergio Romano
Luigi Romersa
Pino Romualdi
Alberto Ronchey
Rossana Rossanda
Ernesto Rossi
Vittorio Giovanni Rossi
Edmondo Rossoni
Gianfranco Rotondi
Antonio Russo
Carlo Salsa
Luigi Salvatorelli
Michele Santoro
Francesca Sanvitale
Cinzia Sasso
Eugenio Scalfari
Edoardo Scarfoglio
Giorgio Scerbanenco
Antonio Sciortino
Carlo Scorza
Matilde Serao
Clara Sereni
Barbara Serra
Michele Serra
Giacinto Menotti Serrati
Beppe Severgnini
Giuliana Sgrena
Giancarlo Siani
Renato Simoni
Marino Sinibaldi
Antonio Socci
Adriano Sofri
Franca Sozzani
Giovanni Spadolini
Lamberto Sposini
Domenico Starnone
Giampietro Stocco
Francesco Storace
Mauro Suttora

T–Z

Vincenzo Talarico
Tiziano Terzani
Michele Tito
Silvia Toffanin
Ettore Tolomei
Enzo Tortora
Gianni Toti
Marco Travaglio
Claudio Treves
Antonello Trombadori
Gaetano Tumiati
Augusto Turati
Filippo Turati
Luigi Ugolini
Leo Valiani
Raf Vallone
Valerio Varesi
Vauro Senesi
Elio Veltri
Walter Veltroni
Franco Venturi
Amleto Vespa
Bruno Vespa
Mitì Vigliero Lami
Demetrio Volcic
Mario Zagari
Sergio Zanetti
Cesare Zavattini
Tullia Zevi
Alvise Zorzi
Lucia Zorzi
Vittorio Zucconi
Marco Zunino

See also

 List of Italians
 Lists of journalists

 
Journalists
Italian